The Type Three platform was a front wheel drive platform designed by the Italian Fiat Group and used during the 1980s and 1990s for a range of Alfa Romeo, Fiat and Lancia models. It is closely related to the Type Two platform which was used in the Fiat Tipo, being merely a stretched version for Fiat Group's saloons and ability to use the platform as all-wheel drive.

Models
Alfa Romeo 155
Fiat Tempra
Lancia Dedra

References

Fiat platforms
Alfa Romeo platforms
Lancia platforms